Anthasthu is a 1985 Indian Tamil-language masala film directed by R. Thyagarajan for Devar Films. The film stars Jaishankar, Lakshmi, Murali and Ilavarasi. It was released on 14 January 1985.

Plot 

Archana is the managing director of her company and puts a lot of weight into perceived status and class distinctions. She also has very exacting standards for her employees and is very suspicious of people who are poor. Sanjeevi lives in one of the buildings owned by Archana and makes it a point to constantly undermine her plans. He also convinces Murali (Murali), a young man searching for a job, to work with him. Sanjeevi plots to bring together Murali and Archana's daughter Radha. After some initial obstacles, the two fall in love, much to Archana's displeasure. The young lovers soon come to learn the complicated history behind Archana and Sanjeevi as well as how they fit into this long-standing feud.

Cast 
Jaishankar as Sanjeevi
Lakshmi as Archana
Murali as Murali
Ilavarasi as Radha
Goundamani as Devdas
Kovai Sarala as Lakshmi
Thengai Srinivasan as Sivaraman, Archana's Manager
Radha Ravi as Madan
Y. G. Mahendran
V. Gopalakrishnan as Archana's father

Soundtrack 
The soundtrack was composed by Shankar–Ganesh.

Reception 
Jayamanmadhan of Kalki wrote after putting so much of effort, the masala has become too nauseating.

References

External links 
 

1980s masala films
1980s Tamil-language films
1985 films
Films directed by R. Thyagarajan (director)
Films scored by Shankar–Ganesh